Largent is an unincorporated community village located chiefly in Morgan County and partly in Hampshire County in the U.S. state of West Virginia. Largent is located on the Cacapon River, approximately 18 miles southwest of Berkeley Springs along Cacapon Road (West Virginia Route 9). It is located by Old Enon Cemetery, Stony Creek, and the Cacapon River. Largent's original town name was Enon. It was most likely renamed when Postal Service found another town of Enon elsewhere in the state. The Enon name is found in local church and cemetery names. The Enon school is found on USGS maps from 1914 through 1923 (Capon Bridge maps). The school has been open at least since the 1930s. The Baileys bought the building in 1958 and it has been a residence since.

The Largent Bridge was built in the 1930s during the New Deal. Initially it was a one lane bridge, but it was quickly expanded to be a two-way bridge. The addition (difference in concrete) can be seen from underneath the bridge.

Businesses
The only (currently operating) local business is Stoney Creek Country Store.

Communication
Largent's post office was in operation from 1906 until the 1950s. Residences and businesses in Largent are currently serviced by Great Cacapon's post office, therefore bearing Great Cacapon addresses. However, Largent's telephone exchange is 947 which is a Paw Paw exchange.

Transportation
Other roads include Kilgore Lane, Alpine Drive, Stoney Creek Road, Dunrovin Lane, Golliday Lane and Oliver Lane. A bridge over the Cacapon River is part of Cacapon Road and leads to the town of Woodrow.

References 

Unincorporated communities in Hampshire County, West Virginia
Unincorporated communities in Morgan County, West Virginia
Unincorporated communities in West Virginia